Tobías Lasser CBE (May 24, 1911 – May 25, 2006), was a recognized Venezuelan botanist, being a fundamental pillar in the creation of the Botanical Garden of Caracas, the School of Biology and the Faculty of Sciences of the Central University of Venezuela. He was born in Agua Larga, Falcón State, Venezuela.

He was honoured in 1960, when botanist Richard William George Dennis published Lasseria, which is a genus of fungi in the Helotiales order.

Publications 
 LASSER, TOBÍAS. 1945: “Exploraciones botánicas en el Estado Mérida”. Impresores Unidos. Caracas – Venezuela. 
 LASSER, TOBÍAS. 1954: “Apuntes sobre la vida y obra de Henri Pittier”. Boletín de la Sociedad Venezolana de Ciencias Naturales. 13(76):1–5. 
 LASSER, TOBÍAS. 1954: “Clave analítica de las familias de las traqueófitas de Venezuela”. Tipografia Americana. Caracas – Venezuela (también publicado en Boletín de la Academia de Ciencias Física Matemáticas y Naturales Nº 48. Caracas – Venezuela).
 LASSER, TOBÍAS. 1955: “Nuestro destino frente a nuestra naturaleza”. Biblioteca de cultural rural. Colección Recursos Naturales Renovables. Ministerio de Agricultura y Cría. Caracas – Venezuela. 
 LASSER, TOBÍAS. 1967: “Información personal acerca del A. dubius a la Sra. Irma De Sola Ricardo”. En: Contribución al estudio de los planos de Caracas. Caracas – Venezuela.
 LASSER, TOBÍAS. 1970: “Materia prima”. Graficas Continente. Caracas – Venezuela.
 LASSER, TOBÍAS. 1971: “Los viajeros científicos en Venezuela”. Boletín de la Asociación Cultural Humboldt. Nº 6. Caracas – Venezuela.
 LASSER, TOBÍAS. 1971: “La revolución biológica”. Acta Botanica Venezuelica. 13(1–4)9–22.
 LASSER, TOBÍAS. BRAUN, AUGUST. Y STEYERMARK, JULIAN A. 1974: “Catálogo de las plantas que cercenan el Jardín Botánico”. Ministerio de Agricultura y Cría. 
 LASSER, TOBÍAS. Y VARESCHI, VOLKMAR. 1957. “La vegetación de los Medanos de Coro”. Boletín de la Sociedad Venezolana de Ciencias Naturales. Caracas – Venezuela.
 LASSER, TOBÍAS. Y VARESCHI, VOLKMAR. 1959. “La vegetación del lago de asfalto de Guanaco”. Acta Biologica Venezuelica. Caracas – Venezuela.
 PITTIER, HENRI FRANÇOIS, BADILLO FRANCERI, VICTOR M., LASSER, TOBÍAS.,  SCHNEE, L. Y LUCES FEBRES, ZORAIDA. 1945–1947: “Catálogo de la flora Venezolana”. Litografía y Tipografía Vargas. Caracas – Venezuela.
 STEYERMARK, JULIAN A. Y LASSER, TOBÍAS. 1981: “A new species of Eugenia (Myrtaceae) from Venezuela”. Brittonia. 33(1):25–27.

See also 
Botany
Venezuela
Central University of Venezuela

References 

Boletín Digital Universitario

Other sources
UCV Sin Fronteras, a magazine of the Central University of Venezuela
 FACULTAD DE CIENCIAS – UCV. 2002: "Plaza del profesor, conifera y afines". Noticiencia. 23(293):9.
 MANARA, BRUNO. 2003: “La corifas y August Brau” Acta Botanica Venezuelica. 26(1):97–102. 
 PERDOMO MARÍN OSCAR y VALLENILA, LUIS. 2003: "Entrevista. Científico, profesor y poeta, Tobías Lasser. Le tengo miedo a la política". Ultimas Noticias.Domingo 30 de septiembre de 2003. Caracas – Venezuela pp:36–37.
 RODRÍGUEZ LEYDA Y HOKCHE, OMAIRA. 2006: “Herbario Nacional de Venezuela (Ven): 85 años de historia y representación de la flora venezolana”. Acta Botanica Venezuelica. 29(2):363–367. 
 TEXERA, YOLANDA. 1992: “La Facultad de Ciencias de la Universidad Central de Venezuela”. En: Ruiz Calderón, Humberto et al.  “La ciencia en Venezuela pasado, presente y futuro”. Cuadernos Lagoven. Lagoven, S.A. Caracas Venezuela pp:50–63.
UCV Sin Fronteras, revista de la Universidad Central de Venezuela.

External links
Boletín Digital Universitario

People from Falcón
20th-century Venezuelan botanists
1911 births
2006 deaths
Central University of Venezuela alumni
Academic staff of the Central University of Venezuela
Commanders of the Order of the British Empire